General elections were held in Italy on 3 June 1900, with a second round of voting on 10 June. The "ministerial" left-wing bloc remained the largest in Parliament, winning 296 of the 508 seats.

Background
Upon the fall of Antonio Starabba di Rudinì in June 1898, General Luigi Pelloux was entrusted by King Umberto with the formation of a cabinet, and took for himself the post of minister of the interior. He resigned office in May 1899 over his Chinese policy, but was again entrusted with the formation of a government. His new cabinet was essentially military and conservative, the most decisively conservative since 1876.

He took stern measures against the revolutionary elements in southern Italy. The Public Safety Bill for the reform of the police laws, taken over by him from the Rudinì cabinet, and eventually promulgated by royal decree. The law made strikes by state employees illegal; gave the executive wider powers to ban public meetings and dissolve subversive organisations; revived the penalties of banishment and preventive arrest for political offences; and tightened control of the press by making authors responsible for their articles and declaring incitement to violence a crime. The new coercive law was fiercely obstructed by the Socialist Party of Italy (PSI), which, with the Left and Extreme Left, succeeded in forcing General Pelloux to dissolve the Chamber in May 1900, and to resign office after the general election in June.

Electoral system
The election was held using 508 single-member constituencies. However, prior to the election the electoral law was amended so that candidates needed only an absolute majority of votes to win their constituency, abolishing the second requirement of receiving the votes of at least one-sixth of registered voters.

Parties and leaders

Results

References

General elections in Italy
Italy
General
Italy